Apparitions of Melody is an album released by Kids in the Way. The standard edition was released in 2005 followed by a deluxe edition the following year.

Track listings 

Standard edition
 "Last Day of 1888"
 "Safety in the Darkness"
 "Even Snakes Have Hearts"
 "Breaking the Legs of Sheep"
 "Apparitions of Melody"
 "The Seed We've Sown"
 "Sad and Guilty Ways"
 "Blind Behind the Wheel"
 "Burt Rutan"
 "Head over Heels" (Tears for Fears cover)
 "This Could Be the Song That Will Change Your Heart"

Dead Letters edition
 "Fiction"
 "Apparitions of Melody"
 "Safety in the Darkness"
 "Even Snakes Have Hearts"
 "Getting Over Me"
 "Last Day of 1888"
 "Breaking the Legs of Sheep"
 "The Seed We've Sown"
 "Sad and Guilty Ways"
 "Blind Behind the Wheel"
 "Burt Rutan"
 "Head Over Heels"
 "This Could Be the Song That Will Change Your Heart"

Music videos on bonus DVD
 "Apparitions of Melody"
 "We Are"
 "Phoenix With a Heartache"
 Brief documentary following the recording of the previously unreleased bonus tracks

References

2005 albums
Kids in the Way albums
Flicker Records albums